Zeng Fanren (born 1941) was the president of Shandong University from February 1998 until July 2000.

References

1941 births
Living people
Presidents of Shandong University
Date of birth missing (living people)
Place of birth missing (living people)